Rakovskaya is a rural locality (a village) in Shenkursky District, Arkhangelsk Oblast, Russia. The population was 76 as of 2010.

Geography 
Rakovskaya is located 96 km northwest of Shenkursk (the district's administrative centre) by road, on the Led River. Ukolok is the nearest rural locality.

References 

Rural localities in Shenkursky District